Pochinki is a rural locality (a village) in Posyolok Zolotkovo, Gus-Khrustalny District, Vladimir Oblast, Russia. The population was 13 as of 2010.

Geography 
Pochinki is located 23 km east of Gus-Khrustalny (the district's administrative centre) by road. Chyokovo is the nearest rural locality.

References 

Rural localities in Gus-Khrustalny District